The 1980 United States presidential election in Maryland took place on November 4, 1980, as part of the 1980 United States presidential election. Voters chose 10 representatives, or electors to the Electoral College, who voted for president and vice president.

On election night, several news outlets actually incorrectly called the state for Ronald Reagan. In a similar vein, many of the same news outlets also called Massachusetts for President Carter, despite the fact that Reagan would ultimately end up winning that state by a very close margin.

Maryland was won by incumbent President Jimmy Carter (D-Georgia), with 47.12% of the popular vote, over former Governor Ronald Reagan (R-California) with 44.18% of the popular vote and Republican US Representative John B. Anderson running as an independent candidate (I-Illinois) with 7.76% of the popular vote. Reagan ultimately won the national vote, defeating Carter.

As of the 2020 presidential election, this is the last presidential election where the Democratic candidate won Maryland without carrying any of Baltimore’s suburban counties. This election marked the first time since 1908 in which Prince George’s County did not vote for the winner of the presidential election.

Results

Results by county

Counties that flipped from Democratic to Republican
Allegany
Calvert
Cecil
Charles
Montgomery
St. Mary's

See also
 United States presidential elections in Maryland
 1980 United States presidential election
 1980 United States elections

Notes

References 

Maryland
1980
Presidential